Hassan El Mouataz (born 21 September 1981 in Rabat, Morocco) is a Moroccan football defender.

El Mouataz played 8 seasons for Belgian side Lokeren between 2006 and 2013 and has also made six appearances for Morocco, scoring two goals. As of 2013, he is a free agent player after his contract with Lokeren ended.

International career
Mouataz earned his first cap for the Morocco national football team during a friendly against Czech Republic on 11 February 2009. The match was played in Morocco and finished 0-0.

Honours
Lokeren
Belgian Cup: 2011–12

References

External links
No.2 Hassan El Mouataz

1981 births
Living people
Moroccan footballers
Footballers from Rabat
Morocco international footballers
K.S.C. Lokeren Oost-Vlaanderen players
Belgian Pro League players
Association football fullbacks
Moroccan expatriate footballers
Expatriate footballers in Belgium
Moroccan expatriate sportspeople in Belgium